Hellenocarum is a genus of flowering plants belonging to the family Apiaceae.

Its native range is Southeastern Europe to Turkey, Cyprus.

Species:

Hellenocarum depressum 
Hellenocarum multiflorum 
Hellenocarum strictum

References

Apioideae
Apioideae genera